The Ji River was a former river in north-eastern China which gave its name to the towns of Jiyuan and Jinan. It disappeared during one of the massive Yellow River floods of 1852, as the Yellow River shifted its course from below the Shandong Peninsula to north of it. In the process, it overtook the Ji and assumed its bed.

Name
The river's Old Chinese pronunciation has been reconstructed as /*[ts]ˤəjʔ/ or /*ʔsliːlʔ/. Ancient Chinese accounts also wrote the name with the character , and Lin Chuanjia considered this to be identical with the  that gave Yuanqu County its name.

Geography

The Ji River changed its precise course several times over the historical period before its disappearance. Generally, it traced its course from an origin near Jiyuan in what is now Henan Province through Shandong to the Bohai Sea. 

During the Neolithic, the Ji was probably a tributary of the Yellow River, merging with its lower course in the North China Plain.

At some point, its flooding shifted the lower course of the Yellow River into a separate channel, while the Ji continued to occupy its earlier path. The two rivers ran parallel to one another under the Zhou, Qin, and Han. 

Under the Han, the Ji River's central course passed through the Great Wild Marsh (t s Dàyězé) and its mouth was in Qiansheng Commandery ( Qiānchéng Jùn).

History
The area around the Ji River was among the most densely populated in China during the Neolithic Age, when its plains were a center for the Longshan and Yueshi cultures. It was honored as a god in ancient Chinese religion.

Sima Qian lists the Ji among the rivers connected by the Honggou Canal (t s Hónggōu, "Canal of the Wild Geese"), whose remote antiquity caused him to place it next after the works of the legendary figure Yu the Great. In fact, the Heshui Canal (t s Héshuǐ Yùnhé) connecting the Ji to the Si was completed by soldiers under the command of King Fuchai of Wu in 483 and 482BC in order to improve their supply lines while at war with the northern states of Qi and Jin. From the Si, the Ji River then had access to the Huai River, which connected to the new course of the Yellow River through the Hongguo Canal and with the Yangtze River through the Hangou Canal just completed by Fuchai's men in 486BC.

Under the Zhou, the state of Qi was centered on the broad floodplain of the Ji. It also used the "clear Ji" along with the "muddy Yellow River" as part of its borders with and defenses against the states of Yan and Zhao. During antiquity, the river was a center of salt production. 

The river went dry during the Wei and Jin period (3rd–4th centuryAD).

The Ji finally disappeared during one of the massive Yellow River floods of 1852, as the Yellow River shifted its course from below the Shandong Peninsula to north of it. In the process, it overtook the Ji and assumed its bed. Other parts of the former course of the Ji form the present Xiaoqing River.

Legacy
The Ji River was the namesake of Jiyuan ("Source of the Ji") and Jinan ("Lands South of the Ji").

References

Citations

Bibliography

 .
 .
 .
 . 
 .
 .
 . 
 .
 .
 .
 .
 .

External links
 《济水》 at Baike.com

Rivers of China
Former rivers